Live in Hollywood is a live album released American rock band by the Doors. It was recorded on July 21, 1969, at the Aquarius Theatre in Hollywood, California, and released in May 2002. The album consists of excerpts from the second of two performances by the Doors at the Aquarius that day.

This is part of previously unreleased material of the Bright Midnight Archives collection of live albums by the Doors.

Track listing
All songs written by the Doors except where noted.
 "Welcome" − 0:21
 "Back Door Man" (Chester Burnett, Willie Dixon) − 4:35
 "Break On Through (To the Other Side)" (Jim Morrison) − 3:53
 "When the Music's Over" − 12:08
 "You Make Me Real" (Morrison) − 3:10
 "Universal Mind" (Morrison) − 4:41
 "Touch Me" (Robby Krieger) − 3:49
 "Soul Kitchen" (Morrison) − 6:50
 "Jim Introduces Ray" − 0:55
 "Close to You" (Dixon) − 4:44
 "What You'd Like to Hear?" − 0:38
 "Peace Frog" (Instrumental) (Morrison, Krieger) − 2:36
 "Blue Sunday" (Morrison) − 3:38
 "Five to One" (Morrison) − 5:54
 Celebration (Morrison) − 2:17
 "Light My Fire" (Krieger, Morrison) − 13:54

Personnel 
Jim Morrison - vocals
Ray Manzarek – organ, keyboard bass & vocals on Close to You
Robby Krieger – electric guitar
John Densmore - drums

References

2002 live albums
Albums produced by Bruce Botnick
Albums recorded at the Aquarius Theater
Bright Midnight Archives